Big Fat Gypsy Gangster is a straight-to-DVD British comedy film directed, produced, written by and starring Ricky Grover. The film centres on Grover's character Bulla from The 11 O'Clock Show, after his release from prison. The film was written by Grover and his wife Maria, and the cast includes Steven Berkoff, Peter Capaldi, Omid Djalili, Rufus Hound and Tulisa Contostavlos.

Plot
The film begins with Bulla (Ricky Grover), a well known dangerous criminal, being released from prison after serving 16 years for burglary. However, as soon as he is released back into society, he finds himself being followed by a film crew. With the world at his fingertips, Bulla returns home to find that everything he was once part of has been taken over by corrupt police officer Conrad (Eddie Webber), the man who put Bulla behind bars. Bulla vows to regain everything that was once his, and begins his offensive by being interviewed on national television by Michael Parkinson.

Cast
 Ricky Grover as Bulla
 Steven Berkoff as Guru Shah
 Peter Capaldi as Peter Van Gellis
 Omid Djalili as Jik Jickels
 Laila Morse as Aunt Queenie
 Tulisa Contostavlos as Shanikwa
 Rochelle Wiseman as Jodieh
 Rufus Hound as Kai
 Eddie Webber as Conrad
 Dave Legeno as Dave
 Leo Gregory as Danny
 Geoff Bell as Geoff
 Roland Manookian as Roland
 Andy Linden as Lenny
 Leanne Lakey as Bev
 Derek Acorah as Himself
 Michael Parkinson as Himself

External links
 
 
 
 https://web.archive.org/web/20110914195538/http://www.4digitalmedia.com/index.php/details/160

2011 films
British comedy films
2011 comedy films
2010s English-language films
2010s British films